The Dixie Beehives were a Canadian Junior "A" ice hockey team from Etobicoke, Ontario. They were a part of the Ontario Junior Hockey League.  The team originated in Oswego, New York as the Oswego Admirals.

History

Oswego Admirals 2005-2007
The Dixie Beehives began as the Oswego Admirals, a Junior A team in the east Division of the OPJHL in 2005 out of Oswego, New York and played out of Romney Field House Ice Rink. In 2006 local business man and hockey fan Joe Moore approached the OPJHL about acquiring a team. The Admirals were for sale and arrangement were made to purchase the team and bring it to Toronto suburb of Weston, Ontario where ice time was procured at Weston Arena.

The Admirals were owned by the same man who owned the Syracuse Jr. Crunch, but are not the same franchise as the Crunch as they currently play in the United States. Their first season went well as they earned a birth into the playoffs. Nine games under .500 on the season, the Admirals did not survive past the first round of their first season. 

The Admirals' first ever game was a 3-1 loss to the Kingston Voyageurs on September 8, 2005.  During that game, the franchise's first ever goal was scored by Jason Deluca. The goalie to start this historic game was Mark Schacker. The Admirals' first home game took place on September 22, 2006—a 2-2 tie with the Cobourg Cougars. Evan Lucas scored the Admirals' first ever home goal while Cory Gershon picked up the tie in net. Their first win was also against the Kingston Voyageurs at home, a 5-2 victory on September 23, 2005.  Corey Callen scored the eventual game-winning-goal and Gershon stopped 30 of 32 shots for that first team victory.

After a good second season and a first round exit to the Port Hope Predators that was shortened by bad weather.

Toronto Dixie Beehives / Dixie Beehives 2007-2011
The Toronto Dixie Beehives began play at Weston Arena on September 15 with a game vs. the Vaughan Vipers. The first season saw the team make the playoffs before going down 3 straight to the Markham Waxers in the quarter final match.

In the summer of 2009, the Beehives relocated from Weston to Etobicoke playing at Canlan Ice Sports Etobicoke and dropped "Toronto" from their name.  On April 3, 2011, the Dixie Beehives officially ceased operations.

Season-by-season results

External links
Beehives Webpage

Ontario Provincial Junior A Hockey League teams
Ice hockey teams in Toronto
2005 establishments in New York (state)
2011 disestablishments in Ontario
Ice hockey clubs established in 2005
Ice hockey clubs disestablished in 2011